Raúl Peralta (born 17 June 1940) is an Argentine-Portuguese former professional tennis player.

Born in Argentina, Peralta competed for his native country originally but married Portuguese Federation Cup player Leonora Santos and had switched allegiance to Portugal by 1970.

Peralta featured in eight Davis Cup ties for Portugal, between 1970 to 1977. He also played in the main draws of the French Open and Wimbledon during his career.

See also
List of Portugal Davis Cup team representatives

References

External links
 
 
 

1940 births
Living people
Argentine male tennis players
Portuguese male tennis players